IDEDOS is a ROM-based disk operating system written in 6502/65816 assembly language for the Commodore 64, 128 and SuperCPU. Its main purpose is to control ATA(PI) devices connected to an IDE64 cartridge and present them like normal Commodore drives. Additionally it supports networked drives (PCLink) and has a built-in machine code monitor and file manager.

Architecture
The C64 KERNAL uses a vector table at page 3 to allow redirection of common kernal file handling and basic functions. This feature is used by IDEDOS to hook into the C64 kernal.

The operating system itself is divided into four pages of 16 KiB which are mapped in when required. The mapping is temporarily switched off while interrupts are running for increased compatibility, however this causes a ≈40 μs latency.

Additional RAM for buffers and internal data are also mapped in from either the IDE64 cartridge (28 KiB) or the additional RAM of the SuperCPU is used. The standard kernal memory locations at page zero and page two are handled in a kernal-compatible way; temporarily used memory is restored after the routines are finished.

Beyond the kernal table IDEDOS has two new calls for bulk data handling (read/write) which allows much faster data transfer rates than the character-based I/O.

The native file system is non-CBM style at the low level to allow partitions greater than 16 MiB. High-level features like the 16-character filenames or filetypes are retained. Due to complexity and memory requirements, the filesystem creation and consistency check is not part of the operating system, unlike CBM DOS or CMD DOS.

Additional filesystems like ISO 9660 or FAT are abstracted internally and mostly use the same routines for handling, thereby little difference is noticeable to user programs, except if some features are not fully implemented.

The device handling is done by additional device numbers assigned to the new devices. The device numbers for IDEDOS devices are configurable and is normally in the range of 10–14. Over the years many programs assumed that there is only device 8 and do not allow selecting anything else; this can be worked around by temporary changing the used IDEDOS device number to 8.

For standard devices, the original kernal routines are used, while IDEDOS devices use custom routines which closely imitate the results and behavior of kernal calls for floppy devices. Kernal calls not going through the vector table (most notably IEC bus-specific calls) present an incompatibility with those programs using them.

Special features (like CD-ROM audio handling) are implemented by new channel 15 commands, while features not found on floppy drives follow the CMD style commands to allow programs to easily support a wider range of devices.

Unlike intelligent external devices which have a separate processor (like 1541 with CBMDOS), IDEDOS runs on the host computer, thereby all disk routines block until finished. This rules out the use of "IRQ loaders" which are commonly used to speed up operation of serial bus peripherals.

Interrupts are generally allowed while IDEDOS is running (they are disabled on rare time-critical operations), however the system was written to be non-reentrant, just like the original kernal.

Short history
In 1996 IDEDOS was born, as there was a need for a system to run the IDE64 1.1 card. It was created by Josef Souček (main code) and Tomáš Přibyl (File manager, Final cartridge monitor adaptation). Additional code came by Jan Vorlíček (BASIC extension), Jan Hlaváček (Duart PCLink).

In 2000 Kajtár Zsolt added CDROM support, new setup code and lot of fixes. Due to limitations of the design the development of a completely rewritten version (0.90) was started by Kajtár Zsolt, which was not ready for general use before 2005. Meanwhile, the old version reached 0.898b in June 2004.

In 2009 the 64 KiB limit for the system started to get tight, and the IDEDOS 0.91 beta was started to refactor the code to gain more space and internal flexibility.

IDEDOS 0.898b
This was the last version of the old IDEDOS series.

Device support
 2 ATA(PI) devices: hard disk, CompactFlash, CDROM, DVD
 Duart RS-232 card for PCLink
 SuperCPU v1/v2

Filesystem
 Custom filesystem called OFS 0.02
 Up to 8 GiB, CHS addressing only, covers the whole disk
 16 character filenames.
 Fixed file types of SEQ, PRG, USR.
 Directories are supported.
 Time stamping supported.
 Files up to 4 GiB, sequential access only
 ISO 9660 filesystem support

Fastload
Built in fast loader supported devices:

 1541 as device 8

Fast load can be switched off in setup in case of incompatibility (non-1541 as device 8). Minimum interleave is 7, fast saver is only supported in manager, and uses an interleave of 8. PAL/NTSC compatible timing.

PCLink
Custom protocol, sequential access only. Supported devices:

 PC64 parallel cable
 Duart RS-232

Setup screen
Includes clock with calendar, ability to set drive numbers, screen colours, auto boot, floppy fast loader, basic clock (TI$), power management, write retry, read-ahead and write cache drive settings, CDROM slow down option.

BASIC extensions
The BASIC extension includes disk handling commands (limited to IDEDOS devices), and adds some new error messages. Commands:

 CD – change working directory
 CDOPEN – open CDROM tray
 CDCLOSE – close CDROM tray
 CHANGE – change HDD device number
 DATE – print date and time
 DIR – normal directory listing
 HDINIT – re-detect IDE devices.
 INIT – initialize memory
 KILL – disable cartridge
 LL – long directory listing with timestamps, and file size in bytes.
 MAN – start file manager
 MKDIR – create directory
 RM – remove file or directory

File manager
It can be used to navigate around directories, start programs, copy/rename/delete files, create directories, and execute plugins to operate on files. Recursive file copy was only added in 0.898b, and in rare cases it does not work.

Monitor
The monitor is almost exactly the Final cartridge monitor in IDEDOS 0.89. Only standard 6502 opcodes are available. The commands are:

 A – Assemble instructions
 B – Bank switch
 C – Compare memory areas
 D – Disassemble from address
 EC – Edit char
 ES – Edit sprite
 F – Fill memory area
 G – Start execution at address
 H – Search pattern
 I – PETSCII display from address
 L – Load memory area
 M – Memory list
 O – Bank switch
 P – Print
 R – Show registers
 S – Save memory area
 T – Transfer memory area
 X – Exit monitor
 @ – Disk command
 # – Convert to hexadecimal
 $ – Convert to decimal
 *r – Read block from floppy drive
 *w – Write block to floppy drive

Miscellaneous features
 Auto boot – can load and start a file on reset or power on.
 Custom screen colours – the default blue screen colours can be changed.
 Set the TI$ BASIC variable to the correct time on reset.
 Displays the start and end address for load.
 Special extension for bulk reading and writing of file data

IDEDOS 0.90
This is the current stable, the latest version is 20100509 (patch 45). Most notable differences to 0.89 are:

 CFS 0.11 filesystem allows seekable and relative files, LBA support and partitioning.
 CMD compatible syntax for path handling and channel 15 commands
 Better PCLink protocol to allow the use of ethernet and USB
 Monitor which works like a freezer and is much faster
 More powerful file manager supporting CMD devices
 DOS wedge commands
 Programmable function keys
 BASIC extension support for non-IDEDOS devices
 Additional device support up to 4 ATA(PI) drives, ZIP and LS-120 support
 Support of V4.1 cartridge, linear read/write transfers for additional speed
 The battery on the IDE64 cartridge can be replaced with a supercap now.

Device support
 4 ATA(PI) devices: hard disk, CompactFlash, CDROM, DVD, LS-120, ZIP-drive
 Duart/SwiftLink/Turbo232/SilverSurfer RS-232, RR-Net/ETFE/ETH64 ethernet, FT245 USB cards for PCLink
 SuperCPU v2
 Additional support for JiffyDOS/DolphinDOS drives

Filesystem
 Custom filesystem called CFS 0.11
 Up to 128 GiB, CHS/LBA addressing, up to 16 partitions
 16 character file names.
 Customizable 3 character file types.
 Directories and soft links are supported.
 Relative files supported.
 Time stamping supported.
 Files up to 4 GiB, seekable
 ISO 9660 filesystem, partial OFS 0.02 support
 FAT12/16/32 slow read-only short filename support with DOS style partition tables

Fastload
Supported devices:

 CBM 1541/1571/1581
 Any drive with JiffyDOS protocol (CMD FD)
 Additional support for DolphinDOS

Device support is automatically detected, but can be disabled manually if needed. PAL/NTSC compatible timing. Fast saver only in the file manager.

PCLink
Custom protocol, sequential access only. Supported devices:

 IEC serial bus
 PC64 parallel cable
 Duart, SwiftLink, Turbo232 RS-232
 RR-Net, ETFE, ETH64 ethernet
 FT245 USB

Setup screen
 Clock with calendar
 Device number configuration and remapping
 Screen, manager and monitor colours
 Miscellaneous settings(auto boot, floppy fast loader, basic clock (TI$))
 ATA(PI) device settings (power management, write retry, read-ahead and write cache, maximal linear read/write)

DOS wedge
Mostly the well known standard DOS wedge commands.

 @ – DOS command
 @$ – Directory
 @# – Select device
 / – Load BASIC program
 % – Load assembly program
 ' – Verify assembly program
 ↑ – Load BASIC program and execute
 ← – Save BASIC program
 £ – Load and execute assembly program
 . – Change directory
 # – Execute shell

BASIC extensions
The BASIC extension adds disk handling commands, which can be used with any device because they use CMD style commands.

 CD – change working directory
 CDOPEN – open CDROM tray
 CDCLOSE – close CDROM tray
 CHANGE – change device number
 DATE – print date and time
 DEF – redefine function keys
 DIR – normal directory listing
 HDINIT – re-detect IDE devices.
 INIT – initialize memory
 KILL – disable cartridge
 KILLNEW – re-new
 LL – long directory listing with timestamps, and file size in bytes.
 MAN – start file manager
 MKDIR – create directory
 RM – remove file
 RMDIR – remove directory

File manager
The file managers inspiration comes from 0.89, though it was rewritten from scratch. The goal was to have a file manager which not only supports IDEDOS devices, but also works well with CMD and other drives.

Monitor
The monitor was rewritten from scratch, the main inspiration was the CCS64 emulator's monitor, but some command ideas came from FC3/AR7/Vice monitors. The goal was to have freezer style (all registers including I/O editable) and fast machine code monitor which supports illegal 6502 and SuperCPU emulation mode opcodes.

Commands:

 @ – Disk command, status and directory
 A – Assemble
 B – Memory configuration, select RAM/ROM
 BT – Backtrace
 C – Compare memory
 D – Disassemble
, – Write hex data to memory and disassemble
 EC – Edit char (binary)
 [ – Write binary data to memory
 ES – Edit sprite (binary)
 ] – Write binary sprite data to memory
 F – Fill memory with byte
 G – Execute at address
 H – Search hex/any/text
 I – Dump memory in PETSCII
 ' – Write PETSCII data to memory
 IO – Dump I/O registers
 - – Write hex data to I/O memory
 IV – Restore I/O vectors
 J – Dump memory in screen code
 . – Write screen code data to memory
 K – Defreeze memory
 L – Load program
 LB – Load binary
 M – Dump memory in hex and PETSCII
 : – Write hex or PETSCII data to memory
 N – Number conversion and calculator
 O – Select work drive
 R – Show registers
 ; – Change registers
 S – Freeze memory/save program
 SB – Save binary
 T – Copy memory
 V – Verify program
 VB – Verify binary
 X – Continue program
 Q – Exit to BASIC warm start
 ←/↑ – Push and pop address(es) to stack.

Miscellaneous features
 Auto boot - can load and start a file on reset or power on.
 Custom screen, monitor and manager colours - the default colours can be changed.
 Set the TI$ BASIC variable to the correct time on reset.
 Displays the start and end address for load/save.
 Special extension for bulk reading and writing of file data
 C128 keyboard support in C64 mode
 Special commands for handling CDROM drives
 Raw directory read
 CMD style long directory lists with timestamps

IDEDOS 0.91 beta
This is still in development. Most notable differences to 0.90 are:

 OFS 0.02 support removed
 Protected BASIC, serial and PCLink routines
 F-keys work with interrupts
 Read ($DEF4) works below I/O
 Auto starting programs work from IEC devices now
 PCLink load below I/O
 SilverSurfer PCLink support, PCLink optional
 FAT filesystem read ($DEF4) and load
 Combined CFS and FAT partitions, per partition filesystem support
 Partition list for FAT and ISO9660
 Dynamic drive enumeration, PCLink detection
 Read ($DEF4) and write ($DEF1) support on modifiable files
 Timestamp update only if modified
 Seeking, modifiable and appendable files on PCLink
 PCLink protocol changes
 PCLink activity LED
 Relative file support has been lost

References

 IDEDOS 0.91 beta http://singularcrew.hu/idedos/beta/
 IDEDOS 0.90 http://singularcrew.hu/idedos/IDE64_users_guide.pdf
 IDEDOS 0.89 http://www.volny.cz/dundera/manual.html

External links
 The webpage of IDEDOS
 The webpage of the IDE64 cartridge

Disk operating systems
Commodore 64 software